The Carillon Tower is a  high-rise in Charlotte, North Carolina, United States. The building was completed in 1991 and it has 24 floors. The top of the high-rise contains a copper-roofed, Gothic central spire shaped like a bell tower, which rises  from the base of the building. This structure is considered to be the most striking feature of the property, and it was designed to resemble the architecture of the historic First Presbyterian Church located across the street. The same church also inspired the building's name. An art gallery is located in the lobby of the building hosts a program of rotating exhibitions, including artist Jean Tinguely's Cascade, a  mobile suspended above an indoor fountain. A landscaped public plaza is situated at the entrance of Carillon on West Trade Street. It has  of Class A office space. This building was built on the former site of the Hotel Charlotte. In 2007 it was sold for US$140 million to Hines.

See also
List of tallest buildings in Charlotte
List of tallest buildings in North Carolina

References

Emporis
Costar
Hines

1991 establishments in North Carolina
Office buildings completed in 1991
Skyscraper office buildings in Charlotte, North Carolina